William Vandever (March 31, 1817 – July 23, 1893) was a United States representative from Iowa and later from California, and a general in the Union Army during the American Civil War.

Biography

Early life
Vandever was born in Baltimore, Maryland, where he attended the common schools and pursued an academic course. He moved to Illinois in 1839 and to Iowa in 1851. He studied law and was admitted to the bar in 1852 and commenced practice in Dubuque, Iowa. He was of Dutch descent.

In 1858 he was elected as a Republican to represent Iowa's 2nd congressional district in the Thirty-sixth Congress, and was re-elected in 1860 to represent it in the Thirty-seventh Congress. He was a member of the peace conference of 1861 held in Washington, D.C., in an effort to devise means to prevent the impending war.

Civil War
In 1861, Vandever was mustered into the Union Army as colonel of the 9th Iowa Volunteer Infantry Regiment.   He commanded the 2nd Brigade in Eugene A. Carr's 4th Division at the battle of Pea Ridge.  He was promoted to brigadier general of Volunteers on November 29, 1862 and sent to command a brigade in the XIII Corps of the Army of the Tennessee.  He returned to the Trans-Mississippi Theater to command the 2nd Division in the Army of the Frontier at the Battle of Chalk Bluff.  He reverted to brigade command under Francis J. Herron during the siege of Vicksburg.  He returned to Iowa as a recruiting officer in January 1864.  He joined up with William T. Sherman's army in command of the 3rd Brigade, 2nd Division, XVI Corps and fought at the battles of Kennesaw Mountain, Atlanta and Ezra Church.  He commanded the Post of Marietta during the fall of 1864 then rejoined Sherman's army in command of the 1st Brigade, 2nd Division, XIV Corps and fought at the battle of Bentonville.  He was brevetted to major general in 1865.

Although his official congressional biography states that Vandever only served in Congress until September 24, 1861 (early in his second term), he never resigned his seat. Iowa's only other congressional seat (in the First District) was vacant from August 4 to October 8, 1861 because Representative Samuel Curtis had resigned his seat after receiving command of the 2nd Iowa Infantry, so for a time Iowa was effectively unrepresented in the U.S. House. In May 1862, Democratic Congressman George H. Browne of Rhode Island raised a challenge to the constitutionality of Vandever holding a military commission and commanding a regiment while remaining a member of Congress, but consideration by the House on that issue was deferred until December 1862. On March 4, 1863, the day after Vandever's second House term ended, his appointment as a brigadier general was confirmed by the Senate.

Later life 
He resumed the practice of law in Dubuque and was appointed United States Indian inspector by President Ulysses S. Grant in 1873, and served until 1877. Vandever moved to San Buenaventura, California in 1884. He was elected as a Republican to represent California's 6th congressional district in the House in the Fiftieth and Fifty-first Congresses (March 4, 1887 – March 3, 1891). At the time, the Sixth District included more than half of the area of the state, extending from San Diego County to Mono County. He was not a candidate for renomination in 1890.

He died in Ventura, California, in 1893 and was buried in Ventura Cemetery.

See also

List of American Civil War generals (Union)
Vandever Mountain

References

 Retrieved on 2008-11-04

Republican Party members of the United States House of Representatives from Iowa
Union Army generals
1817 births
1893 deaths
Burials in Ventura County, California
American people of Dutch descent
People of Iowa in the American Civil War
Politicians from Baltimore
Politicians from Dubuque, Iowa
People from Ventura, California
Republican Party members of the United States House of Representatives from California
19th-century American politicians
Military personnel from California